Huitzilxotzin was a Queen of Tenochtitlan as a wife of Aztec emperor Acamapichtli. She was a daughter of Tenqacatetl and mother of Prince Tlatolqaca. She was a grandmother of Princes Cahualtzin, Tetlepanquetzatzin and Tecatlapohuatzin.

See also

List of Tenochtitlan rulers
Xiuhcuetzin

Sources

External links

Tenochca nobility
14th-century women
Queens consort
Nobility of the Americas